Hector (or Victor Lambda) are a series of a microcomputers produced in France in the early 1980s.

In January 1980, Michel Henric-Coll founded a company named "Lambda Systems" in Toulouse, that would import a computer (produced by "Interact Electronics Inc" of Ann Arbor, Michigan) to France. The computer was sold under the name of "Victor Lambda".

"Lambda Systems" went bankrupt in July 1981, along with "Interact". In December 1981, "Micronique", an electronic components company based in southern Paris, acquires the rights to the "Victor Lambda".

In 1982, "Victor Lambda Diffusion", a subsidiary, distributes the "Victor Lambda". The first machines built in the United States were not a success, and the following models were designed and produced in France at the headquarters of the "Micronique" company. The company uses the slogan: "The French Personal Computer".

In 1983, the "Victor" is renamed "Hector", to avoid confusion with the machines from the Californian company "Victor Technologies" (formerly "Sirius Systems Technology").

The last model introduced was the Hector MX, with production of the series ending in 1985. The series was not successful, due to the focus on the French market, intense competition from Amstrad machines and high prices.

Models

Victor Lambda

The Victor Lambda was a rebranded Interact Home Computer(also called The Interact Family Computer 2) microcomputer. Introduced in 1980, it had a chiclet keyboard and built-in cassette recorder for data storage.

Specifications:
 CPU: Intel i8080, 2.0 MHz
 Memory: 8K RAM, expandable to 16K RAM; 2K ROM
 OS: Basic Level II (Microsoft BASIC v4.7); EDU-Basic (both loaded from tape)
 Keyboard: 53-key chiclet
 Display: 17 × 12 characters text in 8 colors; 112 × 78 with 4 colors from a palette of 8
 Sound: SN76477 (one voice, four octaves)
 Ports: Television (RGB), two joysticks, RS232 (optional)
 Built-in cassette recorder (1200 Bps)
 PSU: External AC transformer

Hector 1 (Victor Lambda 2)
The Hector 1 was a 1983 computer, based on the Victor Lambda. Initially sold as Victor Lambda 2 it was renamed to avoid trademark confusion. Also known as Hector 16K. More than 100 games were published for this machine.

It was eventually considered as an entry level machine.

Specifications:
 CPU: Zilog Z80 @ 1.7 MHz
 Memory: 16K RAM
 OS: Basic Level III (loaded from tape)
 Keyboard: mechanical
 Display: 17 × 12 text in 8 colors, 112 × 78 in 8 colors
 Sound: SN76477N (one voice, four octaves)
 Ports: Television (RGB), two joysticks, RS232 (optional)
 Built-in cassette recorder (1200 Bps)
 PSU: Built-in

Hector 2 HR
The Hector 2HR is a 1983 computer with a Zilog Z80 processor, 16KB of ROM and 48KB of RAM. Initially sold as Victor Lambda 2HR, it was renamed avoid trademark confusion. Graphics were improved, with a resolution of 243x231 in 4 colors, and 40x23 character text. It has an built-in cassette recorder and an optional disk drive (DISK II). At launch there were sixty software titles available on tape. It was considered as a more serious machine for those wishing to program their own games.

Specifications:
 CPU: Zilog Z80A @ 5 MHz
 Memory: 48K RAM; 4KB ROM
 OS: Basic Level III (loaded from tape)
 Keyboard: mechanical
 Display: 40 × 22 text; 112 × 78 in 8 colours, 243 × 231 in 4 colours
 Sound: SN76477 (one voice, four octaves)
 Built-in cassette recorder

DISK II device
The "Disk II" is a dual external -inch floppy disk drive with a dedicated processor. The Hector processor would handle the screen, keyboard and printer, while the floppy drive processor would run CP/M and manage floppy disks. Communication took place via the bi-directional parallel port.

Programming languages
The programming language is not available in ROM but loaded at startup. This makes it possible to distribute several languages, with BASIC 80, Pascal MT+, Cobol 80, Fortran 77, Forth and Assembly being available.

Hector 2HR+
The Hector 2HR+, also released in 1983, is similar to the previous model, but including the BASIC language in ROM (thus freeing up more RAM memory for user programs).

Specifications:
 CPU: Zilog Z80A @ 5 MHz
 Memory: 48K RAM; 16KB ROM
 OS: Basic Level III
 Keyboard: mechanical
 Display: 40 × 22 text in 8 colours; 112 × 78 in 8 colours, 243 × 231 in 4 colours
 Sound: SN76477 (one voice, four octaves)
 Ports: Television (RGB, SECAM), two joysticks, Centronics, Disc Drive
 Built-in cassette recorder
 PSU: Built-in

Hector HRX
The Hector HRX, also released in 1983, is similar to the previous model, but changes BASIC for a Forth language interpreter in ROM and features a 64KB RAM. An early 1983 review mentioned as positive compatibility with existing Lambda II HR software, but pointed lack of high-profile titles like arcade game conversions.  It was considered as a professional machine, capable of running small business applications like text processors, spreadsheets and databases. A 1985 review of the system praised the varied peripherals available, but again criticized the lack of software.

Specifications:
 CPU: Zilog Z80A @ 5 MHz
 Memory: 64K RAM; 16K ROM
 OS: Forth
 Keyboard: mechanical
 Display: 40 × 22 text in 8 colours; 112 × 78 in 8 colours, 243 × 231 in 4 colours
 Sound: SN76477 (one voice, four octaves)
 Ports: Television (RGB, SECAM), two joysticks, Centronics, Disc Drive
 Built-in cassette recorder
 PSU: Built-in

Hector MX
The Hector MX, released in 1985, is similar to the HRX but offers BASIC, Forth, Logo and Assembly as languages available in ROM.

Specifications:
 CPU: Zilog Z80A @ 5 MHz
 Memory: 48K RAM; 64K ROM
 OS: BASIC 3X, HRX Forth, Logo, Assembly
 Keyboard: mechanical
 Display: 40 × 22 text in 8 colours; 112 × 78 in 8 colours, 243 × 231 in 4 colours
 Sound: One voice, four octaves
 Ports: Television (RGB, SECAM), two joysticks, Centronics, Disc Drive
 Built-in cassette recorder
 PSU: Built-in

Software
Some software like Wordstar or Multiplan exists for this series of machines, along with many small games.

References

Microcomputers
Lists of computer hardware
Z80-based home computers
Computer companies of France
History of computing in France